Volodymyr Serhiyovych Stryzhevskyi (born 4 May 1953 in Drohobych, Ukrainian SSR) is a coach of Soviet Union and Ukraine.

External links
  Profile at FC Dnipro Dnipropetrovsk website
  Carpe diem. Первая лига
  Чемпионат Украины 1992/93 - Высшая лига. Высшая лига. Результаты игр.
 

1953 births
Living people
People from Drohobych
Soviet footballers
SC Lutsk players
FC Zirka Kropyvnytskyi players
FC Podillya Khmelnytskyi players
FC Dynamo Kyiv players
FC Dnipro players
FC Shakhtar Pavlohrad players
FC Kryvbas Kryvyi Rih players
Ukrainian football managers
Ukrainian expatriate football managers
Expatriate football managers in Kazakhstan
FC Kryvbas Kryvyi Rih managers
FC Podillya Khmelnytskyi managers
NK Veres Rivne managers
FC Aktobe managers
FC Kyzylzhar managers
Soviet football managers
Ukrainian Premier League managers
Association football goalkeepers
Sportspeople from Lviv Oblast